Lynchburg  is an unincorporated community in southeastern Laclede County, Missouri, United States. It is located at the intersection of Missouri routes 32 and 95, approximately 30 miles southeast of Lebanon.

A post office called Lynchburg was established in 1897, and remained in operation until 1996. The community has the name of David and R. D. Lynch, early settlers.

References 

Unincorporated communities in Laclede County, Missouri
Unincorporated communities in Missouri